is a Japanese actor represented by Office Miyamoto. His eldest son is fashion designer Kazuki Kuraishi.

Biography
After dropping out from Nihon University College of Art, Kuraishi won the Mr. Mediocre Grand Prix award. He later joined to Daiei Film. Kuraishi started making regular appearances in Tokyo Keibi Shirei The Guardsman as Taiin Sugii.

On 1974, he dated The Guardsman co-star Ken Utsui's daughter and later married in six months.

On recent years Kuraishi and his wife appeared on travel series in TV Tokyo.

Filmography

Films

TV series

Stage

References

External links
 

Japanese male actors
1944 births
Living people
People from Nagano Prefecture